Lamphun is one of Thailand's seventy-six provinces (changwat), lies in upper northern Thailand. Neighboring provinces are (from north clockwise) Chiang Mai, Lampang, and Tak.

Geography
Lamphun is in the Ping River valley. It is surrounded by mountain chains, with the Thanon Thong Chai Range in the west and the Khun Tan Range in the east of the province. It is some 670 kilometres from Bangkok and 26 kilometres from Chiang Mai. Lamphun is regarded as the smallest province of northern region of Thailand.

National parks
There are a total of three national parks, two ofwhich are in region 16 (Chiang Mai) and Doi Chong in region 13 (Lampang branch) of Thailand's protected areas.
 Mae Ping National Park, 
 Mae Takrai National Park, 
 Doi Chong National Park,

Wildlife sanctuaries
There area two wildlife sanctuaries in region 16 (Chiang Mai) of Thailand's protected areas.
 Omkoi Wildlife Sanctuary, 
 Doi Phu Muang Wildlife Sanctuary,

History
Under its old name of Haripunchai, Lamphun was the northernmost city of the Mon kingdom of the Dvaravati period, and also the last to fall to the Thai. In the late-12th century it came under siege from the Khmer, but did not fall. However, in 1281 King Mengrai of Lan Na finally seized the city, and made it part of his kingdom. After Burmese expansion in the 16th century, Lamphun was under Burmese rule for two centuries. In the 18th century, with the rise of Thonburi and Bangkok against Burmese rule, local leaders from Lampang agreed to be their allies. Lamphun was finally freed from the Burmese and ruled by relatives of Lampang's leader, gaining vassal status from Bangkok. Eventually, after the administrative reform of Bangkok government in the late-19th century, Lamphun became part, as a province, of Siam.

Symbols
The provincial seal shows the temple Wat Phra That Haripunchai, which was already the main temple of the city Lamphun during Mon times. The gold-covered chedi is said to contain a relic of Buddha.

The provincial flower is the Flame of the Forest (Butea monosperma), and the provincial tree is the Rain Tree (Samanea saman).

Transport
 Air: Lamphun is served by Lamphun Airport.
 Rail: Lamphun's main station is Lamphun Railway Station.

Foods
Kaeng khae, a spicy curry consisting mainly of vegetables with chicken, frog, fish or snails.
Kuaitiao lamyai, stewed pork noodles soup with dried longan, originated in Lamphun.

Administrative divisions

Provincial government
The province is divided into eight districts (amphoes). These are further divided into 51 subdistricts (tambons) and 551 villages (mubans).

For national elections the province is divided into three constituencies. Constituency 1 covers the Mueang District except Tambon Makhuea Chae; Constituency 2 the districts Pa Sang, Mae Tha, and Tambon Makhuea Chae of Mueang District; and Constituency 3 the districts Ban Hong, Thung Hua Chang, and Li.

Local government
As of 26 November 2019 there are: one Lamphun Provincial Administration Organisation and 40 municipal (thesaban) areas in the province. Lamphun has town (thesaban mueang) status. Further 39 subdistrict municipalities (thesaban tambon). The non-municipal areas are administered by 17 Subdistrict Administrative Organisations - SAO (ongkan borihan suan tambon).

Human achievement index 2017

Since 2003, United Nations Development Programme (UNDP) in Thailand has tracked progress on human development at sub-national level using the Human achievement index (HAI), a composite index covering all the eight key areas of human development. National Economic and Social Development Board (NESDB) has taken over this task since 2017.

Gallery

References

External links

Provincial website
Lamphun province, Tourism Authority of Thailand

 
Provinces of Thailand